Club Deportivo Básico Balonmano Aragón, was a handball team based in Zaragoza, Aragón, Spain. Caja3 Aragón currently plays in Liga ASOBAL. The team was known as CAI Aragón in 2010–11 season and as Caja3 Aragón in 2011–12 season.

Honours
EHF Cup: 0
Runners-up: 2006–2007

History

After the 2004-05 season, the team was promoted from Honor Division B to Liga ASOBAL. The manager was Fernando Bolea and the president, Ricardo Arregui, who reached the club in 2003.

For the 2011–12 season, the team would be known as Caja3 Aragón due to sponsorship of Caja3. This sponsorship was cancelled following 2011–12 season due to financial problems of Caja3.

On 11 April 2016, after withdrawing from the 2015–16 Liga ASOBAL, BM Aragón was dissolved.

Season by season 

11 seasons in Liga ASOBAL

2015–16 squad

|  style="font-size:95%; vertical-align:top;"| Goalkeepers
01  Jorge Olano
12  Álvaro Fernández
33  Julio Rodríguez

|  style="font-size:95%; vertical-align:top;"| Line players
15  Pedro Fuentes Sánchez-Migallón
19  Miguel Arnillas
90  Alejandro Egea Álvarez

|  style="font-size:95%; vertical-align:top;"| Wingers
02  Amadeo Sorli
21  Antonio Cartón
22  Álvaro Pascual
24  Javier Ariño

|  style="font-size:95%; vertical-align:top;"| Back players
05  Segio García
06  Borja Domingo
13  Juan Castro
14  Juan Agustín Vidal
18  Demetrio Lozano
26  Ignacio Alemany Juan

|  style="font-size:95%; vertical-align:top;"| Technical staff
 Head coach:  Miguel Ángel Martín
 Assistant coach:  José Luis Gargallo Azpelicueta

.

Notable players
 Hussein Zaky
 Dalibor Doder
 Mariano Ortega
 Iñaki Malumbres Aldave
 Beno Lapajne
 Valero Rivera Folch
 Jorge Maqueda
 Robert Arrhenius
 Ivan Stanković
  Vukašin Stojanović

Notable former coaches
 Veroljub Kosovac
 Mariano Ortega

Stadium information
Name: - Príncipe Felipe Arena
City: - Zaragoza
Capacity: - 12,000 people
Address: - Plaza Ángel Sanz Briz 16, 1ºA

References

External links
BM Aragón Official Website 

Spanish handball clubs
Sport in Zaragoza
Liga ASOBAL teams
Handball clubs established in 2003
Handball clubs disestablished in 2016
2003 establishments in Spain
2016 disestablishments in Spain
Sports teams in Aragon
Defunct handball clubs